Zhou Hongyi (born 4 October 1970) is a Chinese billionaire entrepreneur. He is the co-founder, chairman and CEO of the Internet security company Qihoo 360. As of November 2018, he is ranked #45 on Forbes China Rich List 2018 and #135 on Forbes Billionaires 2018, with an estimated net worth of $4.7 billion.

Early life
Zhou Hongyi was born in Huanggang, Hubei, China. He has a master's degree from Xi'an Jiaotong University.

Career
Zhou was one of China's pioneer internet entrepreneurs, founding 3721 in 1998, a search engine which sells Chinese-language keywords for Roman-alphabet domain names. 3721 was acquired by Yahoo! in 2004 for US$120 million with Zhou heading Yahoo! China's operation. However, with differences between Zhou and Yahoo's management, Yahoo eventually sold its China operations to Alibaba in 2005 and Zhou left to start Qihoo 360.

Personal life
Zhou is married, and lives in Beijing, China.

References

1970 births
Living people
Businesspeople from Hubei
Chinese billionaires
People from Huanggang
Xi'an Jiaotong University alumni
Chinese computer programmers
Chinese technology company founders
Members of the 13th Chinese People's Political Consultative Conference
Members of the Jiusan Society